National Highway 247, commonly referred to as NH 247 is a national highway in  India. It is a spur road of National Highway 47. NH-247 traverses the state of Maharashtra in India.

Route 

Dahegaon, Khaperkheda, Kamthi, Kuhi, Umred, Bhiwapur, Paoni, Adyal, Pahela, Bhandara, Ramtek.

Junctions  

  Terminal near Dahegaon.
  near Gumthala.
  near Wadoda.
  near Umred.
  near Bhiwapur.
  near Bhandara.
  Terminal near Ramtek.

See also 

 List of National Highways in India
 List of National Highways in India by state

References

External links 

 NH 247 on OpenStreetMap

National highways in India
National Highways in Maharashtra